Federação Portuguesa de Atletismo (FPAtletismo), is the governing body for the sport of athletics in Portugal.

History
The Federação Portuguesa de Atletismo was founded on 5 November 1921, under the name "Federação Portuguesa de Sports Atléticos". It is headquartered in Linda-a-Velha, Oeiras. It's an independent sports governing body, of public interest, non-profit, ruled by their own code.

The Federação Portuguesa de Atletismo (FPAtletismo) organizes the Portuguese Indoor and Outdoor Athletics Championships. It has 21 regional associations, promoting and directing the practice of athletics, in men's and women's. In according with the International Association of Athletics Federations in which is a member, it also organizes doping tests in official competitions, as outside them, so it can detect doping in athletics.

Portugal in Athletics
In the Olympic Games, Portugal has won 10 medals at Athletics, including the country's only 4 gold medals.

Kits
Portugal's kits are currently supplied by Puma.

Olympic medalists

Other Competitions
World Athletics Competitions
 European Athletics Championships
 European Athletics Indoor Championships
 European U23 Championships
 European Junior Championships
 European Cross Country Championships
 European Mountain Running Championships

See also
Portuguese records in athletics
Portuguese Outdoor Men's Athletics Championship
Portuguese Indoor Men's Athletics Championship
Portuguese Outdoor Women's Athletics Championship
Portuguese Indoor Women's Athletics Championship

References

External links 

Portugal
Athletics
Athletics in Portugal
National governing bodies for athletics
Sports organizations established in 1921